The People of Bergslagen (Swedish: Bergslagsfolk) is a 1937 Swedish drama film directed by Gunnar Olsson and starring Karin Ekelund, Sten Lindgren and Arnold Sjöstrand. It was shot at the Sundbyberg Studios of Europa Film in Stockholm.

Cast
 Karin Ekelund as 	Karin Löwenskiöld
 Sten Lindgren as 	Bertil Åkerman
 Arnold Sjöstrand as 	Rudolf Lunding
 Hugo Björne as Captain Håkan Löwenskiöld
 Gerda Björne as 	Anne-Marie Löwenskiöld
 Hjalmar Peters as Persson
 Hartwig Fock as 	Larsson - Mine-captain
 Frithiof Bjärne as Farmhand
 Ingrid Luterkort as 	Persson's Maid
 Gunnar Björnstrand as 	Birthday guest 
 Lillie Björnstrand as 	Birthday guest 
 Alma Bodén as 	Johanna 
 Helga Brofeldt as 	Farmer's wife 
 John Ericsson as	Farmer 
 Erik Forslund as Meeting participator 
 Knut Frankman as 	Secretary at meeting 
 Sven-Eric Gamble as Boy at merchant's shop 
 Wictor Hagman as 	Member of the board 
 Nils Johannisson as 	Member of the Mine-board 
 Börje Mellvig as 	Birthday guest 
 Erik Rosén as 	Member of the Mine-board 
 Ulla Wikander as Birthday guest

References

Bibliography 
 Qvist, Per Olov & von Bagh, Peter. Guide to the Cinema of Sweden and Finland. Greenwood Publishing Group, 2000.

External links 
 

1937 films
Swedish drama films
1937 drama films
1930s Swedish-language films
Swedish black-and-white films
Films directed by Gunnar Olsson
1930s Swedish films